Austria competed at the 1948 Summer Olympics in London, England. 147 competitors, 115 men and 32 women, took part in 79 events in 17 sports.

Medalists

Athletics

Key
Note–Ranks given for track events are within the athlete's heat only
Q = Qualified for the next round
q = Qualified for the next round as a fastest loser or, in field events, by position without achieving the qualifying target
NR = National record
OR = Olympic record
N/A = Round not applicable for the event
Bye = Athlete not required to compete in round
NP = Not placed

Men
Field Events

Women
Track & road events

Women
Field events

Boxing

Canoeing

Cycling

Eight cyclists, all men, represented Austria in 1948.

Individual road race
 Rudi Valenta
 Hans Goldschmid
 Siegmund Huber
 Josef Pohnetal

Team road race
 Rudi Valenta
 Hans Goldschmid
 Siegmund Huber
 Josef Pohnetal

Sprint
 Erich Welt

Time trial
 Walter Freitag

Tandem
 Kurt Nemetz
 Erich Welt

Team pursuit
 Walter Freitag
 Hans Goldschmid
 Josef Pohnetal
 Heinrich Schiebel

Diving

Equestrian

Fencing

Seven fencers, four men and three women, represented Austria in 1948.

Men's sabre
 Hubert Loisel
 Heinz Putzl
 Werner Plattner

Men's team sabre
 Werner Plattner, Heinz Putzl, Heinz Lechner, Hubert Loisel

Women's foil
 Ellen Müller-Preis
 Fritzi Wenisch-Filz
 Gabriele Zeilinger

Football

Head coach: Eduard Frühwirth

Gymnastics

Women's team all-around
Gretchen Hehenberger

Hockey

Head coach:

Rowing

Austria had seven male rowers participate in two out of seven rowing events in 1948.

 Men's coxless pair
 Gert Watzke
 Kurt Watzke

 Men's coxed four
 Erwin Bittmann
 Karl Sitter
 Franz Frauneder
 Theodor Obrietan
 Karl Riedel (cox)

Sailing

Open

Shooting

Three shooters represented Austria in 1948.
Men

Swimming

Weightlifting

Wrestling

Art competitions

Mixed literature, epic works
Hans Breidbach-Bernau

References

External links
Official Olympic Reports
International Olympic Committee results database

Nations at the 1948 Summer Olympics
1948
Summer Olympics